Pierre Robert may refer to:

 Pierre Robert (composer)  (ca. 1618–1699), French composer 
 Pierre Robert (DJ) (born 1955), radio disc jockey in Philadelphia
 Pierre-François-Joseph Robert (1763–1826), French lawyer, politician and professor of public law
 Jean-Pierre Robert (born 1956), French double bass player and author

See also
 Robert Pierre (disambiguation)